These 104 species belong to the genus Microgaster, braconid wasps.

Microgaster species

 Microgaster acilius Nixon, 1968
 Microgaster albomarginata Fahringer, 1935
 Microgaster alebion Nixon, 1968
 Microgaster archboldensis Fernandez-Triana, 2018
 Microgaster arctostaphylica Shaw, 2012
 Microgaster areolaris Thomson, 1895
 Microgaster asramenes Nixon, 1968
 Microgaster atropa de Saeger, 1944
 Microgaster auriculata (Fabricius, 1804)
 Microgaster australis Thomson, 1895
 Microgaster balearica Marshall, 1898
 Microgaster biaca Xu & He, 1998
 Microgaster breviterebrae Xu & He, 2003
 Microgaster brittoni Viereck, 1917
 Microgaster campestris Tobias, 1964
 Microgaster canadensis Muesebeck, 1922
 Microgaster caris Nixon, 1968
 Microgaster chrysosternis (Tobias, 1986)
 Microgaster congregatiformis Viereck, 1917
 Microgaster consors Nixon, 1968
 Microgaster crassicornis Ruthe, 1860
 Microgaster debilitata Papp, 1976
 Microgaster deceptor Nixon, 1968
 Microgaster deductor Nixon, 1968
 Microgaster discoidus Xu & He, 2000
 Microgaster ductilis Nixon, 1968
 Microgaster dudichi Papp, 1961
 Microgaster elegans Herrich-Schäffer, 1838
 Microgaster epagoges Gahan, 1917
 Microgaster erro Nixon, 1968
 Microgaster eupolis Nixon, 1968
 Microgaster famula Nixon, 1968
 Microgaster femoralamericana Shenefelt, 1973
 Microgaster ferruginea Xu & He, 2000
 Microgaster filizinancae  Koçak & Kemal, 2013
 Microgaster fischeri Papp, 1960
 Microgaster flaviventris Xu & He, 2002
 Microgaster fulvicrus Thomson, 1895
 Microgaster fusca Papp, 1959
 Microgaster gelechiae Riley, 1869
 Microgaster glabritergites Xu & He, 2000
 Microgaster godzilla Fernandez-Triana & Kamino, sp. nov.
 Microgaster gregaria (Schrank, 1781)
 Microgaster harnedi Muesebeck, 1922
 Microgaster himalayensis Cameron, 1910
 Microgaster hospes Marshall, 1885
 Microgaster hungarica Szépligeti, 1896
 Microgaster hyalina Cresson, 1865
 Microgaster intercus (Schrank, 1781)
 Microgaster kuchingensis Wilkinson, 1927
 Microgaster latitergum Song & Chen, 2004
 Microgaster leechi Walley, 1935
 Microgaster longicalcar Xu & He, 2003
 Microgaster longicaudata Xu & He, 2000
 Microgaster longiterebra Xu & He, 2000
 Microgaster luctuosa Haliday, 1834
 Microgaster magnifica Wilkinson, 1929
 Microgaster memorata Papp, 1971
 Microgaster meridiana Haliday, 1834
 Microgaster messoria Haliday, 1834
 Microgaster nerione Nixon, 1968
 Microgaster nigricans Nees, 1834
 Microgaster nitidula Wesmael, 1837
 Microgaster nixalebion Shaw, 2004
 Microgaster nixoni Austin & Dangerfield, 1992
 Microgaster nobilis Reinhard, 1880
 Microgaster novicia Marshall, 1885
 Microgaster noxia Papp, 1976
 Microgaster obscuripennata You & Xia, 1992
 Microgaster opheltes Nixon, 1968
 Microgaster ostriniae Xu & He, 2000
 Microgaster pantographae Muesebeck, 1922
 Microgaster parvistriga Thomson, 1895
 Microgaster peroneae Walley, 1935
 Microgaster phthorimaeae Muesebeck, 1922
 Microgaster planiabdominalis You, 2002
 Microgaster polita Marshall, 1885
 Microgaster postica Nees, 1834
 Microgaster procera Ruthe, 1860
 Microgaster pseudotibialis Fahringer, 1937
 Microgaster punctithorax Xu & He, 2000
 Microgaster raschkiellae Shaw, 2012
 Microgaster rava You & Zhou, 1996
 Microgaster reticulata Shestakov, 1940
 Microgaster rubricollis Spinola, 1851
 Microgaster rufipes Nees, 1834
 Microgaster ruralis Xu & He, 1998
 Microgaster scopelosomae Muesebeck, 1926
 Microgaster shennongjiaensis Xu & He, 2001
 Microgaster stictica Ruthe, 1858
 Microgaster subcompleta Nees, 1834
 Microgaster subtilipunctata Papp, 1959
 Microgaster syntopic Fernandez-Triana, 2018
 Microgaster szelenyii Papp, 1974
 Microgaster taishana Xu, He & Chen, 1998
 Microgaster tianmushana Xu & He, 2001
 Microgaster tjibodas Wilkinson, 1927
 Microgaster tortricis (Schrank, 1781)
 Microgaster tremenda Papp, 1971
 Microgaster uliginosa Thomson, 1895
 Microgaster utibilis Papp, 1976
 Microgaster varicornis Rondani, 1872
 Microgaster yichunensis Xu & Chen, 2002
 Microgaster yunnanensis Xu & He, 1999
 Microgaster zhaoi Xu & He, 1997

References

Microgaster